Line 20 (Pink) is a planned line of São Paulo Metro.

At  in length, the line will serve as the first line of the future Subway Ring, which will include Line 5-Lilac (Moema ↔ Chácara Klabin stretch), the extension of Line 2-Green to station Dutra, and future Line 23-Magenta (Lapa ↔ Dutra).

Stations

References

São Paulo Metro
Proposed railway lines in Brazil

pt:Metrô de São Paulo#Linhas em obras